Sera, Nepal is a village in Achham District in the Seti Zone of western Nepal. At the time of the 1991 Nepal census, the village had a population of 2478 living in 499 houses. At the time of the 2001 Nepal census, the population was 2626, of which 31% was literate.

Sera is traditionally home to Chhetri Bhandari's who were originally Khadka's, came from Doti Kingdom.

References

Populated places in Achham District
Village development committees in Achham District